The Good–Hartle Farm is a historic home and farm complex located near Hagerstown, Washington County, Maryland, United States. The house is a two-part, two-story stuccoed structure, with a log section built in 1765, and 1833 limestone addition. A -story frame addition dates from the 20th century. Also on the property is an early-19th-century log springhouse with a cooking fireplace, and two late-19th- to early-20th-century frame outbuildings.

The Good–Hartle Farm was listed on the National Register of Historic Places in 1999.

References

External links
, including photo from 1999, at Maryland Historical Trust

Farms on the National Register of Historic Places in Maryland
Houses completed in 1765
Houses in Hagerstown, Maryland
National Register of Historic Places in Washington County, Maryland